Dwayne Yearwood (born 15 August 1980) is a Barbadian cricketer. He played in one List A match for the Barbados cricket team in 2008.

See also
 List of Barbadian representative cricketers

References

External links
 

1980 births
Living people
Barbadian cricketers
Barbados cricketers